KMIL is a radio station airing a country music format licensed to Cameron, Texas, broadcasting on 105.1 MHz FM.  The station also broadcasts the local sports games. The station is owned by Centex Broadcasting, LLC.

Current and past on-air staff include Gene "Unk" Smitherman, Silas Strausberger, Charlie McGregor, Joe Smitherman, Jeff Smitherman, Kathy Pool, Rob "The Robber" Reed, Chris Ormston "Chris Austin", Brett Eberhart, Joel Uvalle Jr, Mike Riggs, Ann Broussard, Robin Cunningham, Al Tag, Nonito Martinez, Alfred Vrazel, Porter Young, "Polka John” Galure, Alan Wood, Frank Summers, Will “The Colonel” Sanders, and "Mama Rose" Mondrik.

References

External links

Country radio stations in the United States
MIL